This is a list of episodes of anime produced for the Japanese series The Familiar of Zero. The series consists of four seasons, and the story follows characters from the second-year class of a magic academy, with the main one being an inept mage Louise and her familiar, a human from Earth, Saito Hiraga.

The first season, released in 2006, entitled , was produced by the Japanese animation studio J.C.Staff and directed by Yoshiaki Iwasaki. The series contained thirteen episodes which aired between July 3 and September 25 on a number of Japanese television networks, which include, but are not limited to Chiba TV and TV Kanagawa. In 2007, the second season, entitled , had Yuu Kou as director. The series contained twelve episodes and aired in Japan between July 9 and September 24 on several Japanese television networks, such as Sun TV, TV Aichi, and TV Saitama. In 2008, the third season, titled  was produced by the same team as the previous season; the series began July 6, 2008 and ended on September 21, 2008. Like the second season, it contained twelve episodes. A fourth and final season titled   aired between January 7, 2012 and March 24, 2012. It also contained twelve episodes.

Each season has two pieces of theme music: an opening theme and a closing theme. All opening themes are performed by Ichiko while all closing themes are performed by Rie Kugimiya, Louise's Japanese voice actress. Season four episodes started with "I'll Be There For You" and ended with "Kiss Shite Agenai"

All four seasons of the series have been released on DVD in Japan.

In April 2007 at Anime Boston, Geneon announced that they had picked up the English dubbing rights of the first season of the anime series under the title The Familiar of Zero. In July 2008, Geneon Entertainment and Funimation Entertainment announced an agreement to distribute select titles in North America. While Geneon Entertainment still retained the license, Funimation Entertainment assumed exclusive rights to the manufacturing, marketing, sales and distribution of select titles. The Familiar of Zero was one of several titles involved in the deal. Funimation released a complete box set of the series on November 4, 2008. Funimation reported their rights to the series expired in August 2011. Sentai Filmworks re-licensed the first series in North America in 2013 and released it digitally. Sentai released the Geneon English-language version on Blu-ray and DVD on April 8, 2014.

Sentai Filmworks licensed the second season (under the name The Familiar of Zero: Knight of the Twin Moons) in North America and released it on March 10, 2015, on  Blu-ray and DVD.
Sentai Filmworks licensed the third season with the OVA (under the name The Familiar of Zero: Rondo of Princesses) in North America and released them on May 12, 2015, on Blu-ray and DVD.
In 2012, Sentai Filmworks licensed the fourth season (under the name The Familiar of Zero: F) in North America and released it on July 14, 2015, on Blu-ray and DVD.

The Familiar of Zero (2006)

The Familiar of Zero: Knight of the Twin Moons (2007)

The Familiar of Zero: Rondo of Princesses (2008)

The Familiar of Zero: F (2012)

References

External links
Official website 
J.C.Staff's The Familiar of Zero website 

Familiar of Zero